William Kirkpatrick (November 7, 1769 – September 2, 1832) was an American physician and politician from New York.

Life
Kirkpatrick was born in Amwell Township, Hunterdon County, New Jersey, he graduated from Princeton College in 1788, studied medicine at the University of Pennsylvania and commenced practice in Whitestown, Oneida County, New York in 1795. He moved to Salina (now a part of Syracuse), Onondaga County in 1806 and continued the practice of medicine. He subsequently became Superintendent of the Onondaga Salt Springs, and was elected as a Democratic-Republican to the 10th United States Congress, holding office from March 4, 1807 to March 3, 1809. He was again Superintendent of the Onondaga Salt Springs from 1810 to 1831, and died in Salina in 1832. Interment in Oakwood Cemetery (Syracuse, New York).

References

1769 births
1832 deaths
People from Hunterdon County, New Jersey
Princeton University alumni
Politicians from Syracuse, New York
Physicians from New York (state)
Democratic-Republican Party members of the United States House of Representatives from New York (state)
People from Whitestown, New York
Burials at Oakwood Cemetery (Syracuse, New York)